Emily Arnold McCully (born July 1, 1939) is an American writer and illustrator who is best known for children's books. She won the annual Caldecott Medal for U.S. picture book illustration in 1993 recognizing Mirette on the High Wire which she also wrote.

Biography
Arnold was born in Galesburg, Illinois, but grew up in Garden City, New York.  She graduated from Pembroke College, now a part of Brown University, in 1961 and earned an M.A. in Art History from Columbia University. At Brown she acted in the inaugural evening of Production Workshop and other plays, co-wrote the annual musical, Brownbrokers, and earned a Phi Beta Kappa key.

In 1976, she published a short story in The Massachusetts Review. It was selected for the O'Henry Collection: Best Short Stories of the Year. Two novels followed: A Craving in 1982, and Life Drawing in 1986. In 2012, McCully published Ballerina Swan with Holiday House Books for Young People, written by legendary prima ballerina Allegra Kent. It has received rave reviews from The New York Times, Kirkus Reviews, and School Library Journal.

As an actor, she performed in Equity productions of Elizabeth Diggs’ Saint Florence at Capital Rep in Albany and The Vineyard Theater in New York City.

Among other awards and honors, McCully has received a Christopher Award for Picnic, the two children's book of Caldecott Medal for Mirette on the High Wire, the Jane Addams Award, the Giverney Award, and an honorary doctorate from Brown University.

Partial bibliography

Children's picture books
 The Bed Book (1976)
Grandmas series
 The Grandma Mix-Up (1988)
 Grandmas at the Lake (1990)
 Grandmas at Bat (1993)
 The Mixed-Up Grandmas Treasury (1997)
 Grandmas Trick-Or-Treat (2001)
 Mirette Series
 Mirette on the High Wire (1992)
 Starring Mirette & Bellini (1997)
 Mirette and Bellini Cross Niagara Falls (2000)
 The Pirate Queen (1998)
 Hurry! (2000)
 Mouse Practice (2001)
 The orphan singer (2002)
 Battle for St. Michaels (2002)
 Picnic (2003)
 First Snow (2004)
 Squirrel and John Muir (2004)
 School (2005)
 The Bobbin Girl (2009)
 Ballerina Swan (2012), written by Allegra Kent
 Popcorn at the Palace  (2014)
 Clara : the (mostly) true story of the rhinoceros who dazzled kings, inspired artists, and won the hearts of everyone ... while she ate her way up and down a continent!

Children's non-fiction
 Manjiro: The Boy Who Risked His Life for Two Countries  (2008)
 My Heart Glow: Alice Cogswell, Thomas Gallaudet, and the Birth of American Sign Language (2008)
 The Secret Cave: Discovering Lascaux (2010)
 Wonder Horse: The True Story of the World's Smartest Horse (2013), non-fiction picture book about Beautiful Jim Key.
 Marvelous Mattie: How Margaret E. Knight Became an Inventor (2013)
 Strongheart: The World's First Movie Star Dog  (2014)
 Queen of the Diamond: The Lizzie Murphy Story (2015)
 Caroline's Comets: A True Story  (2017), biography of Caroline Herschel.

References

External links

 
 Emily Arnold McCully at Balkin Buddies
 Emily Arnold McCully at publisher Scholastic
  1967 to October 2017

 

1939 births
American children's writers
American women illustrators
American children's book illustrators
Caldecott Medal winners
People from Galesburg, Illinois
People from Garden City, New York
Pembroke College in Brown University alumni
Columbia University alumni
Writers from Illinois
Writers from New York (state)
Living people
21st-century American women